Enugwu Aguleri is a community in Anambra state (Nigeria) with one of the oldest dynasty in South eastern Nigeria in which the kingdom has produced over thirty four kings of Aguleri, up to the 18th century, and has continued, in recent times, up to now, to produce the ruler of Enugwu Aguleri. The Ezeora dynasty has remained powerful been the sacred holder of the Ovo Eri and as well occupying the throne of Eri at Obu-Gad. It is located in the present Anambra State.

Administration

Traditional Rulership: - Hereditary (Ezeora Dynasty)

The Ndi Ichie, Ndi Ojiana, Eze Eri Cabinet chiefs and the Town Union Executives.

Villages
Enugwu Aguleri comprises six (6) villages  namely Amuleri (Ama Amuleri), Umuezunu (Ama Umuezunu), Umuokpoto (Ama Umuokpoto), Umuekwe (Ama Umuekwe), Umuakwu and Umuenini popularly known as Enugwu Ndida (Ama Obuga).

Festivals
Olili Obibia Eri festival and New yam festival (Alo mmo)
Olili Obibia Eri (Eri Festival) in Enugwu Aguleri attracts thousands of visitors home and abroad annually.
Traditional titles: (seven traditional Sacraments for men only)
Ozo, Ogbuevi, Ivijioku, Ekwu, Amanwulu, Oba and Nze.
Nze is the highest of these titles and it is mostly taken by the elderly in Aguleri.
The paraphernalia of these titles include: Red cap(okpu ododo), Anklet, Ngwuagiliga/alo (title scepter), Akpa ewu (goat skin bag), Nzu (white chalk) and trypod stool (oche mgbo) and a medium-sized bell.
Uvio and Nchachaa are the musical instruments for the titled men's dirge in Aguleri. Non titled men are not allowed to partake in this Uvio dance and defaulters are heavily fined.
Nze which is the highest of these titles is highly revered and the diseased members are buried in a special cemetery(oli-nze) designated for men of the Nze society at midnight by their members. Some of these practices started diminishing with the advent of Christianity in Aguleri.

Traditional titles for women;
IYOMU & ikiti;This title is taken only by reputable matured women in Aguleri who have contributed in one way or the other to the development of the community. The woman to take this title  and her family must be ready to go through the expenses that go with the ceremony that accompany this title in the form of the properties the concerned lady must procure to be able to support the affluence she is expected to display during the ceremony such as lengths of very expensive cloths (wrappers), expensive fashion tables etc. She must also be ready to procure all kinds of food items to be used in entertaining guests during the occasion. The newly inducted members of this group undergo procession beautifully decorated and each of them at a time must be given opportunity to display her ability to dance (itu unyaka) in full admiration of guests, spectators and family members.

 Christianity has dealt a very heavy blow on most of the traditional values of Aguleri  just like many other igbo communities where on conversion some Christians unfortunately classify some aspects of our cultures as satanic without any substantiation.

Institutions of learning
 Unity Primary School, Enugwu Aguleri.
 Willie Obiano Secondary School, Enugwu Aguleri. 
 ENUGU-OTU PRIMARY SCHOOL, AGULERI-OTU

External links
 The Eri Kingdom 
 Ohaneze approves 3 international festivals to unite Ndi-Igbo
Igbo historians claim Ndigbo are direct descendants of Jacob who settled in Aguleri

Populated places in Anambra State